Amaleh-ye Sofla (also Romanized as ‘Amaleh-ye Soflá; also known as ‘Amaleh-ye Pā'īn) is a village in Miyan Darband Rural District, in the Central District of Kermanshah County, Kermanshah Province, Iran. At the 2006 census, its population was 38, in 9 families.

References 

Populated places in Kermanshah County